Wally Holmes may refer to:

Waldo Holmes (born 1928), American musician and songwriter known as Wally Holmes
Wally Holmes (rugby union) (1925/26–2009), England international rugby union player